Love Revival is a compilation album by American country singer Reba McEntire. The album was released on January 2, 2008 exclusively at Hallmark gift and card stores in the United States.

On February 11, 2008, the album was certified gold by the RIAA. The album consists of six previously released songs and four new recordings. One of the new recordings, "I'll Still Be Loving You", is a cover of a song originally recorded by the band Restless Heart, for whom it was a Number One country hit in 1987. McEntire's version features backing vocals from Restless Heart.

Track listing

Certifications

References

External links
 Hallmark's Webpage for Love Revival

Reba McEntire compilation albums
2008 compilation albums
MCA Records compilation albums